Brian McCarthy (born 20 January 1936) is  a former Australian rules footballer who played with St Kilda in the Victorian Football League (VFL).

Notes

External links 
		

Living people
1936 births
Australian rules footballers from Victoria (Australia)
St Kilda Football Club players
Yarrawonga Football Club players